Yeogang High School (Korean: 여강고등학교, Hanja: 驪江高等學校) and Yeogang Middle School (Korean: 여강중학교, Hanja: 驪江中學敎) are private-dependent, co-educational schools located in Yeoju, Gyeonggi Province, approximately one hour southeast of Seoul. The middle school serves grades seven to nine, while the high school serves grades ten to twelve.  Offering students the choice of a comprehensive or vocational education, the former program prepares students for general university study, whereas the latter program prepares students for business and management university study or immediate employment.

Official Yeogang School links
 Yeogang High School, Rep. of Korea
 Yeogang Middle School, Rep. of Korea
 Yeogang English School, Rep. of Korea
 Yeogang Application for Admission, Rep. of Korea

See also
 Education in Korea
 County of Yeoju

School seals

The school moniker, in two three-stroke diamond inscribed blocks, consists of "yeo gang", or "bristle river".
The name comes from the way local waterways sinuate like horse bristles during the wet season.
The red badge symbolizes a strong will to study, the blue badge large dreams.

High schools in South Korea
Educational institutions established in 1970
Schools in Gyeonggi Province
Yeoju
Private schools in South Korea